Duvall is a city in King County, Washington, United States, located on SR 203 halfway between Monroe and Carnation.  The population was 8,034 at the 2020 census.

History

The area that became known as Duvall was historically the home of the Snoqualmie and other ancestral Tulalip Native American tribes.  Following their relocation under the Treaty of Point Elliott, the area was homesteaded by veterans of the Civil War.  The center of present-day town was located on a hillside homesteaded by Francis and James Duvall, loggers who arrived in 1871.

An early milestone in the settlement of Duvall proper was the relocation of the town of Cherry Valley. Around 1909, the Chicago, Milwaukee and St. Paul Railroad agreed to move Cherry Valley homes and businesses to Duvall in order to continue the construction of a railroad line along the Snoqualmie River.  The newly relocated town, briefly named Cosgrove after Samuel G. Cosgrove, underwent a real estate boom; streets and sidewalks were laid and a train depot was constructed. This was followed by construction of a movie house, a drug store, a new schoolhouse, and several hotels.  By 1911, the Duvall Citizen began publishing regular editions of news events.

On April 28, 1968, nearly 3,000 fans attended a rock concert at a farm in Duvall where an upright piano was dropped from a helicopter.  Performances included Country Joe and the Fish.  This concert is well known to locals as the Piano Drop.  This event inspired the Sky River Rock Festival which occurred later that year.

The town of Duvall experienced a great amount of construction during the period of 2008–2009 with the aim of making the one-road town center more accessible and presentable to tourists.

Events
The year's largest and most popular event is the 'Duvall Days', which is held the first weekend in June in downtown Duvall, with other activities at nearby locations. Saturday events include a parade, street side vendors, live entertainment, and many games and activities for children. There is a car show called 'The Duvall Classic Car Show' held in the Duvall Safeway parking lot, and the 'Duvall Run' at McCormick Park with 10-kilometer and 5-kilometer races. 2017 and 2018 also included an evening fireworks display. On Sunday, the staff of Fire District 45 host their annual pancake breakfast at the downtown station.

Other events taking place in Duvall throughout the year include:
 Irwin Community Easter Egg Hunt, McCormick Park (Saturday before Easter)
 Sandblast Festival of the Arts (third weekend in July)
 SummerStage (outdoor music, July)
 Irwin Movies In The Park, McCormick Park (August)
 Tree Lighting (start of Christmas season)
 March of the Vegetables, a parade celebrating the vegetables and Art of Duvall

Geography
Duvall is located at  (47.734149, -121.975493).

Climate
The climate in this area has mild differences between highs and lows, with adequate rainfall year-round.  Due to its location relative to the Northern Cascades, the surrounding Snoqualmie Valley is subject to flooding from late fall to early spring. According to the Köppen Climate Classification system, Duvall has a marine west coast climate, abbreviated "Cfb" on climate maps.

Demographics

2010 census
As of the census of 2010, there were 6,695 people, 2,224 households, and 1,816 families residing in the city. The racial makeup of the city was 89.7% White, 0.4% African American, 0.5% Native American, 2.7% Asian, 2.9% from other races, and 3.8% from two or more races. Hispanic or Latino of any race were 7.7% of the population.

There were 2,224 households, of which 52.3% had children under the age of 18 living with them, 70.2% were married couples living together, 8.0% had a female householder with no husband present, 3.4% had a male householder with no wife present, and 18.3% were non-families. 14.4% of all households were made up of individuals, and 2.8% had someone living alone who was 65 years of age or older. The average household size was 2.99 and the average family size was 3.33.

The median age in the city was 34.4 years. 33.8% of residents were under the age of 18; 4.8% were between the ages of 18 and 24; 33.2% were from 25 to 44; 23.7% were from 45 to 64; and 4.5% were 65 years of age or older. The gender makeup of the city was 49.5% male and 50.5% female.

Government and politics
Duvall leans heavily Democratic like King County as a whole, having cast more than two-thirds of its votes for Joe Biden in the 2020 presidential election.

Education
It is in the Riverview School District. Its sole comprehensive high school is Cedarcrest High School.

Notable people

Robert A. Funk, businessman
Amy Tryon, equestrian
Martha Wright, actress

References

External links

 City of Duvall
 Duvall Historical Society

Cities in King County, Washington
Populated places established in 1913
1913 establishments in Washington (state)
Cities in the Seattle metropolitan area
Cities in Washington (state)